Steelwork Maschine is an independent record label based in Brest, France, specialising in producing, and distributing through their mail-order, extreme musics from the industrial and post-industrial genres, such as Martial industrial, Dark Ambient, Neo-classical, Neo-folk, Power Electronics, Noise, and Experimental.

History

Steelwork Maschine was founded in 2003 by Kris G. (a pseudonym for Christophe Gales, member of Westwind) and Serge Usson (member of Neon Rain and Storm Of Capricorn), after the demise of Kris G's previous CD-R label Black Sun Rising. It is registered in France as a voluntary association.
Steelwork Maschine also started a mail-order store on internet in 2004.

Productions
Started as a way to produce their own releases (Neon Rain's CD Dirtier Than The Dirt and Westwind's double LP Tourmente I), Steelwork Maschine quickly started to produce other artists' records, beginning with French projects PPF & ICK's collaborative LP Individualistes / Collectivistes  in 2005, then with Cheerleader 69's LP Godriders In The Sky  in 2006. The label then went away from the vinyl format with the releases of Deuterror's CD Le Gueule de Guerre  in 2007, and Neon Rain's We Are Meat  in 2008.

Sub-label
A sublabel called Steelkraft Manufactory was created in 2007, with the purpose of releasing CD-Rs in small editions of 100 copies, with hand-made covers (blank digipaks, stickers...). The first series started with the release of the collaborative record Ligne Claire, and has now reached its 10th reference with Dunkelheit's album Temps Modernes.

Concerts organisation
Steelwork Maschine has been erratically organizing concerts in Brest, including two concerts by English post-industrial music group Death in June, which now remain the two last concerts ever played by the band. They have not organized other events since 2006.

Artists

References

External links
 Steelwork Maschine label website
 Steelwork Maschine online store
 Steelwork Maschine on Discogs
 Steelkraft Manufactory on Discogs
 Steelwork Maschine on Myspace

French independent record labels
Noise music record labels
Industrial record labels
Ambient music record labels
Experimental music record labels
Electronic music record labels